BuzzSaw was a Maurer AG SkyLoop roller coaster located within the Gold Rush Country section of the Dreamworld amusement park on the Gold Coast of Australia. The ride began operation on 17 September 2011 as part of Dreamworld's 30th birthday celebrations. The ride was permanently closed on 31 August 2021, due to Dreamworld prioritising future development plans.

The steel ride consisted of a single train which held 12 riders and lasted approximately 50 seconds. BuzzSaw featured the tallest inversion in the Southern Hemisphere and was the second-highest inversion of its type in the world.

The ride was themed around a fictitious series of unexplainable occurrences in the Town of Gold Rush which dated back to the late 1800s. The setting was based on encounters with the ghost of one Jack Darke, who was killed by a buzz saw at a sawmill built after the gold rush ended.

The ride was sold to Gumbuya World in Melbourne where it now remains in active service.

History
In December 2009, a Gold Coast Bulletin report detailed a variety of new attractions for the region's theme parks and stated that Dreamworld was in negotiations with a manufacturer to add to its "Big 6" thrill rides. In February 2011, Dreamworld's operator, Ardent Leisure, announced the addition of two new rides in 2011 as part of Dreamworld's 30th Birthday. In April 2011, it was announced that in addition to a family thrill ride (Shockwave which opened in June 2011), another major ride would be opened in time for the September school holidays. The name "BuzzSaw" was confirmed two months later by the park's outgoing CEO, Noel Dempsey, who also confirmed plans to team up with DreamWorks Animation. Vertical construction for BuzzSaw started around the same time.

On 20 July 2011, Dreamworld officially announced the addition of BuzzSaw to the Dreamworld park to the public. Testing for the ride began in early September 2011, and BuzzSaw opened officially to the public on 17 September 2011.

Marketing 
Marketing for BuzzSaw began on 6 July 2011 when Dreamworld released a television commercial promoting their plans to open a "new bone-chilling thrill ride" by September of that year. At this stage, the name BuzzSaw had not been officially announced. A second television marketing campaign was released for BuzzSaw on 8 September 2011, just before its official opening on 17 September 2011. The commercial stated "this September fear will reach new heights". Banners around Dreamworld advertise BuzzSaw as a "ripper of a ride".

Closure
On 17 July 2021, an email to pass holders confirmed that BuzzSaw would be retired after 31 August, just shy of 10 years of operation. The park stated that they decided to cease operation of BuzzSaw due to the close proximity of Steel Taipan and the park's focus on a viable future development. The ride had been plagued with low ridership following the first few months after opening, and was under maintenance for most of 2018 and 2020 with no major differences upon reopening. Demolition of the BuzzSaw commenced in November with the heartline roll being removed first.

Characteristics

At the time of closure, BuzzSaw was one of Dreamworld's seven thrill rides alongside The Claw, The Gold Coaster, The Giant Drop, Mick Doohan's Motocoaster, Pandamonium and Tail Spin. This also ranks it tied as the third-highest inversion worldwide.

The ride consisted of a single Maurer Söhne X-Car train which held 12 riders. The train featured two cars, each of which sat riders in three rows of two. Riders were seated in the open carriage and were restrained by a lap bar.

Experience

Backstory
BuzzSaw was themed around a series of unexplainable occurrences in the Town of Gold Rush which date back to the late 1800s. In 1876, the Town of Gold Rush was formed. It was a prosperous town during the great gold rush. Eleven years later, in 1887, the town's Gold supply was completely gone. The town then established a sawmill and turned their focus to timber. On a clear moon-lit night, a sawmill worker named Jack Darke was killed by the buzz saw after he had a scuffle with some other workers who were attempting to set the building on fire. The circumstances leading up to his death were covered up by the town with the legend stating that Jack tried to burn down the sawmill and slipped into the path of the buzz saw. The sawmill has remained closed since with many people claiming encounters with the ghost of Jack on nights similar to that of his death.

Entrance and station
The entrance to BuzzSaw was located in the Town of Gold Rush where the Helicopter Joy Flights used to operate, opposite the former entrance of the Eureka Mountain Mine Ride. The station was themed to the abandoned sawmill in the town of Gold Rush and told the story of Jack Darke. Within the building, guests were directed through a series of queue switchbacks and pathways. Several television screens were embedded in the walls and showed burning timber. Parts of the theming were caged off with crime scene signs. Throughout the queue, guests were able to hear the sound of buzzsaws as well as several warnings to not go any further and to escape while they can. Large circular saws (a.k.a. buzzsaws) are located on the side and roof of the building.

Ride
BuzzSaw was a steel, Maurer Söhne SkyLoop XT 150 roller coaster. At the top of this lift hill, the car is pulled slowly back over on itself before it is released into a full heartline roll and a drop down a steep hill back towards the station. The train then oscillates between the two hills before it is caught by the chain hill and slowly lowered back down into the station. A single ride on BuzzSaw is completed in approximately 50 seconds.

Reception
The reception of BuzzSaw was generally positive. Melinda Siegmeier of the Gold Coast Bulletin stated "the scream machine is certainly a fitting way to describe Dreamworld's newest thrill ride the BuzzSaw". Siegmeier also commented on the vertical lift hill: "by this stage I was certainly wishing I was back on the ground". Ardent Leisure, the owners of Dreamworld, have claimed the launch of the ride to be a success. In the first year of operation, over 435,000 people rode the attraction. However, in the worldwide Best Roller Coaster Poll in 2012, BuzzSaw (along with other identical SkyLoop rides) ranked 221 out of 365.

Incidents
In 2018 the BuzzSaw malfunctioned and six people got stuck on the ride for 15 minutes.

See also
 2011 in amusement parks
 2021 in amusement parks

References

External links
 
 

Roller coasters operated by Ardent Leisure
Roller coasters in Australia
Dreamworld (Australia)